Six members of the United States House of Representatives were elected in special elections in 1963.

List of elections 

|-
| 
| Clement W. Miller
|  | Democratic
| 1958
|  | Incumbent member-elect had died October 7, 1962, but was posthumously re-elected.New member elected January 22, 1963.Republican gain.
| nowrap | 

|-
| 
| Clyde Doyle
|  | Democratic
| 19441946 1948
|  | Incumbent died March 14, 1963.New member elected June 11, 1963.Republican hold.
| nowrap | 

|-
| 
| Francis E. Walter
|  | Democratic
| 1932
|  | Incumbent died May 31, 1963.New member elected July 30, 1963.Democratic hold.
| nowrap | 

|-
| 
| Hjalmar C. Nygaard
|  | Republican
| 1960
|  | Incumbent died July 18, 1963.New member elected October 22, 1963.Republican hold.
| nowrap | 

|-
| 
| Leon H. Gavin
|  | Republican
| 1942
|  | Incumbent died September 15, 1963.New member elected November 5, 1963.Republican hold.
| nowrap | 

|-
| 
| Homer Thornberry
|  | Democratic
| 1948
|  | Incumbent resigned December 20, 1963 to become judge of the United States District Court for the Western District of Texas.New member elected December 21, 1963.Democratic hold.
| nowrap | 

|}

See also 
 List of special elections to the United States House of Representatives

References 

 
1963